West Ferguson Rural LLG is a local-level government (LLG) of Milne Bay Province, Papua New Guinea.

Wards
01. Fayayana
02. Ailuluai
03. Ukeokeo
04. Toagesi
05. Igwageta
06. Kukuya
07. Ibwananiu
08. Mapamoiwa
09. Fagululu
10. Iamalele South
11. Iamalele North
12. Gewata
13. Saibutu
14. Niubuo
15. Ebadidi
16. Tutubea
17. Bwayobwayo
18. Masimasi
19. Gwabegwabe
20. Atugamwana
21. Agealuma
22. Didiau
23. Kalokalo
24. Fatavi
25. Wapolu

References

Local-level governments of Milne Bay Province